Vadakurangaduthurai is a village located in the Papanasam taluk on the north bank of the Kaveri river, Tamil Nadu, India. It is 4 km from the town of Papanasam and is also known as Aduthurai and Aaduthurai Perumal Koil.

Etymology and Legend
It is believed that when Lord Rama was passing through south, he wanted to cross the Kaveri river. This place was earlier a port on the Kaveri river. In order to attain a safe river crossing, Hanuman worshipped a Shivalinga here, which he named as Dayanidheeswarar. Thus, the port got the name 'Vada Kurangu Kadu Thurai' meaning 'The forest-port of the northern monkey' in Tamil which later came to be known as Vadakurankaduthurai. The temple is still located in the village and is an important pilgrimage site.

Temples
 Sri Dayanidheeswarar Shiva Temple - one of 275 Padal Petra Sthalams.
 Aduthurai Perumal Temple - one of the 108 Divya Desams

Schools
 Srividyasram Matriculation School

References

External links
 http://www.sripoornamahameru.org - Website of Srivdiyashram School

Villages in Thanjavur district